Nogometni klub Šenčur, commonly referred to as NK Šenčur or simply Šenčur, is a Slovenian association football club based in the town of Šenčur, which plays in the Slovenian Third Division. The club was founded in 1951.

Honours
Slovenian Third League
 Winners: 2004–05, 2008–09

MNZG-Kranj Cup
 Winners: 2007–08, 2010–11, 2011–12, 2012–13, 2013–14

References

External links
Official website 
Weltfussballarchiv profile

Association football clubs established in 1951
Football clubs in Slovenia
1951 establishments in Slovenia